List of cities in the Cayman Islands
George Town (capital) - pop. 31,785
West Bay - pop. 11,436
Bodden Town - pop. 6,918
East End - pop. 1,552
North Side - pop. 1,258
West End - pop. 1,000
Old Man Village - pop. 200

Sources 
Population Source - World Gazetteer

 
City
Cayman Islands